The guaiabero (Bolbopsittacus lunulatus) is a species of parrot in the family Psittaculidae, belonging to the  monotypic genus Bolbopsittacus and closely related to the lovebirds (Agapornis) and hanging parrots (Loriculus). It is endemic to the Philippines and locally known as bubutok. Its common name is derived from its reputation for eating guavas.

Description
The sexes differ in plumage. The adult male is green overall, with more yellowish underparts and a pale blue face and collar and wing primaries. The rump is yellow-green. The bill is grey-blue and with a darker tip, and the eyes dark brown. The adult female is also greenish, with a yellow collar and less blue on the face. It has black crescent markings on the nape and rump. Its bill is paler grey.

Behaviour
It inhabits lowland forests and adjacent cleared country. It is a predominantly fruit eating parrot, and has been recorded near fruit trees such as mangos. The breeding habits in the wild remained virtually unknown until a few years ago, but based on recent observations it appears to nest in a self-excavated cavity inside an arboreal ant nest or termitaria.

Taxonomy
The guaiabero was first described as Psittacus lunulatus by Tyrolean naturalist Giovanni Antonio Scopoli in 1786. The only member of its genus, it is distinctive. Four subspecies have been recognised. The nominate race lunulatus occurs on Luzon, birds on Leyte are darker with a more distinctive blue collar and some purple-tinge on the face and classified as subspecies intermedius, those on Mindanao and Panaon have greener cheeks and are classified as subspecies mindanensis, and finally those on Samar are similar to the Leyte subspecies, but with a more yellow tone overall and classified as callainipictus.

References

External links
Oriental Bird Images: Guaiabero   Selected photos

Psittacidae
Endemic birds of the Philippines
Birds described in 1786
B
Taxonomy articles created by Polbot